Something Wild is a 1961 American independent drama neo noir psychological thriller film directed by Jack Garfein, and starring Carroll Baker, Ralph Meeker and Mildred Dunnock. The film follows a young New York City college student who, after being brutally raped, is taken in and held captive by a mechanic who witnessed her suicide attempt on the Manhattan Bridge. The film is based on the 1958 novel Mary Ann by Alex Karmel, who co-wrote the screenplay with Garfein.

Released in December 1961, Something Wild violated a number of Hollywood conventions and taboos by showing an on-screen rape and brief nudity, and received a mixed response from film critics.

Plot

Mary Ann Robinson, a teenaged girl attending college in New York City, is brutally raped while walking in a park near her home in the Bronx. Traumatized by the experience, Mary Ann washes away all the evidence and destroys her clothing. She hides the rape from her mother and stepfather, with whom she has an already distant relationship. Mary Ann unsuccessfully tries to continue living her normal life. She takes the subway to school and faints during the crush of people. This results in the police escorting her home, which upsets her prim and unsympathetic mother.

The rape continues to haunt Mary Ann. She leaves school abruptly and walks downtown, through Harlem and Times Square to the Lower East Side. There she rents a room from a sinister-looking landlord. She takes a job at a five and ten store, where her coworkers dislike her because she is distant and unfriendly. Her crude, promiscuous neighbor Shirley at the rooming house is rebuffed when she offers to "introduce" Mary to her male friends.

Overwhelmed at her job after her co-workers play a prank on her, Mary Ann walks across the Manhattan Bridge and almost jumps into the East River, but she is stopped by Mike, a mechanic. At first, he seems to have her best interests in mind, offering her shelter and food. She decides to stay with him, but when he comes home drunk and tries to attack her, Mary Ann kicks him in the eye. The following morning, he has no recollection of the incident, but his eye is badly hurt and eventually must be removed.

Mike now says that he wants Mary Ann to stay there, saying "I like the way you look here." She wants to leave, but he refuses to let her go, keeping the door locked. He holds her captive in the apartment, but she refuses to have anything to do with him.

One night, Mike proposes to Mary Ann and she rejects him, saying she just cannot. He again attempts to be physical with her. Mary Ann reveals to Mike that she was the one who blinded him in one eye. Mike still insists he needs her. When Mary Ann discovers the door unlocked, she leaves, walking through the city and sleeping in Central Park. She later returns to Mike's apartment, and when he asks why she has returned, she says "I came for you." She writes her mother, who comes to the apartment and is shocked to see where and with whom Mary Ann lives. She has married Mike and announces that she is pregnant (if by Mike or the rape is not revealed). Her mother insists that she come home, and Mary Ann tries to impress upon her mother that she now considers the apartment her home.

Cast

Production 
Jack Garfein had made his debut as film director with End as a Man (1957). He formed Prometheus Productions with his wife Carroll Baker. It obtained film rights to Mary Ann, the first novel by Alex Karmel, published in 1958. Karmel and Garfein wrote the script, and United Artists agreed to finance. It was originally called Something Wild in the City.

The score for the film was by American composer Aaron Copland. Morton Feldman was originally commissioned to compose the score, but when Garfein heard the music, he reportedly said "My wife is being raped and you write celesta music?" and promptly replaced Feldman with Copland. In 1964, Copland reused some of the film's themes in his symphonic work Music for a Great City. The original film score, taken from private session recordings preserved by the director, was finally released on CD in 2003.

The opening title sequence, which featured sped-up city imagery, was created by Saul Bass.

Director of photography Eugen Schüfftan was a noted German cinematographer and inventor of the Schüfftan process who went on to win the Academy Award for Best Cinematography the following year for The Hustler. The film was shot on location in New York City.

The supporting cast included Jean Stapleton, playing Mary Ann's boisterous rooming-house neighbor, and Doris Roberts, portraying Mary Ann's store co-worker.

Release
Something Wild had its theatrical premiere at the Plaza Theatre in New York City on December 20, 1961.

Box office
The film was not a financial success, described by Dorothy Kilgallen as a "box office disappointment" and "a financial blow to the star and her husband."

Critical response
Jonas Mekas wrote in Film Quarterly that the film was the "most interesting American film of the quarter; it may become the most underestimated film of the year."

Wanda Hale of the New York Daily News praised Baker as a "fine actress" and Garfein's direction "very tight and smooth," summarizing: "Something Wild carries a moral for the feminine sex: Don't walk in the city's parks alone after dark."

New York Times critic Bosley Crowther said that it was "quite exhausting to sit through that ordeal in the apartment," and that "it is not too satisfying, because it isn't quite credible and the symbolic meaning (if there is one) is beyond our grasp."

In 2007, the film was screened at New York's IFC Center, billed as a "lost indie film classic."

Home video
The film was released for the first time on DVD as part of the MGM Limited Edition Collection in December 2011. The Criterion Collection released the film on Blu-ray and DVD on January 17, 2017.

See also
 List of American films of 1961

References

External links 

Something Wild: Last Chances an essay by Sheila O’Malley at the Criterion Collection

1961 films
1961 drama films
1961 independent films
American independent films
American drama films
1960s English-language films
Films about suicide
Films scored by Aaron Copland
Films set in the Bronx
Films shot in New York City
Films about post-traumatic stress disorder
American rape and revenge films
United Artists films
1960s American films